George Alfred Flowers (7 May 1907 – July 1991) was an English footballer, born in Darlaston, Staffordshire. He played as a half back in the Football League between 1929 and 1940.

He first played for Edlington Colliery Welfare before being picked up by Doncaster Rovers in 1927 where he spent most of his professional career with 161 total appearances. He later played for Bradford Park Avenue, Tranmere Rovers and Rochdale.

One nephew, Ron Flowers, played for England (1955–1966) and Wolverhampton Wanderers (1952–1967) and Ron's brother, John Flowers, played for Doncaster, Stoke City and Port Vale. His niece-in-law, through John, was former darts world champion Maureen Flowers.

He died in Rochdale in 1991.

Honours
Doncaster Rovers
Third Division North
Champions 1934–35

References

1907 births
1991 deaths
People from Darlaston
English footballers
Association football wing halves
Doncaster Rovers F.C. players
Bradford (Park Avenue) A.F.C. players
Tranmere Rovers F.C. players
Rochdale A.F.C. players
English Football League players
English Football League managers
English football managers